Tactus Records (Italian Casa Discografica Tactus) is an Italian classical music recording label based in Bologna, Italy. It was founded in 1986 by a local businessman Serafino Rossi (1927-3 December 2009). The Province of Bologna held a concert in Serafino Rossi's memory in November 2010. The label focuses on Italian music.

Artists who made their early recordings on Tactus include Rinaldo Alessandrini, Filippo Maria Bressan as well Alessandro Baccini

References

External links
Homepage

Classical music record labels
Record labels established in 1986
Companies based in Bologna
Italian companies established in 1986